Kiro Gligorov (3 May 1917 – 1 January 2012) was a Macedonian politician who served as the first President of the Republic of Macedonia (now North Macedonia) from 1991 to 1999.

Early life
He was born in Štip, then in the Bulgarian occupation zone of Serbia during World War I, as Kiro Pančev. Gligorov later graduated from the University of Belgrade's Law School After the defeat of Yugoslavia in 1941, he returned to Skopje (then annexed by Bulgaria), where Gligorov worked as a lawyer until 1943. In 1942, Gligorov was arrested by the Bulgarian police for reporting that he was a pro-Serbian communist. He was released on the orders of Skopje Mayor Spiro Kitinchev, who guaranteed for him as a trustworthy Bulgarian. Afterwards he participated in the National Liberation War of Macedonia as a secretary of the Initiative committee for the organization of the Antifascist Assembly of the National Liberation of Macedonia (ASNOM) and a finance commissioner in the Presidium of ASNOM.

Politics 
After World War Two he was appointed Assistant Secretary General of the Presidency of the Government of the Federal People's Republic of Yugoslavia, between 1945–1947, and then Assistant Minister of Finance from 1947–1952. After this year he held several positions: Assistant Chairman of the Economic Council of the Government of the Federal People's Republic of Yugoslavia (1952–1953), Deputy Director of the Federal Bureau of Economic Planning (1953–1955), Secretary of Economy - Coordinator in the Federal Government (1956). Later he served as Finance Minister of Yugoslavia from 1962 to 1967. He held various other high positions in the political establishment of the Socialist Federal Republic of Yugoslavia, including a member of the Yugoslav Presidency, as well as President of the Assembly of the Socialist Federal Republic of Yugoslavia from 15 May 1974 to 15 May 1978.

In February 1990 he joined the Macedonian Forum for Preparation of a Macedonian National Program. Gligorov actively participated in the work of this forum, which discussed the situation in the Yugoslav Federation and the possibilities for resolving the independence of the Socialist Republic of Macedonia. Following the promulgation of the Declaration of Sovereignty of the State on January 25, 1991, Gligorov was elected the first President of the independent and sovereign Republic of Macedonia by the Assembly of the Republic of Macedonia on 27 January 1991. On March 7, he entrusted the mandate to Nikola Kljusev to form the first government.

Gligorov played an active role in the process of Macedonia's political independence and international recognition. Thus, he was the author of the question posed in the referendum held on 8 September 1991: "Are you in favor of a sovereign and independent state of Macedonia with the right to enter a future union of sovereign states of Yugoslavia?" According to the claim of the then President of the Assembly of the Republic of Macedonia, Stojan Andov, in August 1991 he had a long and difficult conversation with the President of the Republic of Macedonia, Kiro Gligorov (who was the author of the referendum question), persuading him to delete the second part of the referendum question. Fearing military intervention by the JNA, Gligorov stuck to his wording on the referendum question. After the successful referendum, Gligorov went to the square "Macedonia" and greeted the gathered citizens with admiration.

After the adoption of the Constitution, all activities for the international recognition of Macedonia were undertaken by President Kiro Gligorov. On 16 December 1991, the Council of Ministers of the European Community (now the European Commission) decided to recognize the independence of those republics of the SFRY that would seek recognition but meet the conditions set by the European Community. The republics of SFRY, which sought international recognition, with the help of the chairman of the Conference on Yugoslavia, forwarded the applications to the Arbitration Commission (led by the French legal expert Robert Badinter), which was to give an opinion before the final decision on recognition. The President of the Republic of Macedonia, Kiro Gligorov, submitted the application for international recognition on time, and the Arbitration Commission prepared a preliminary text which it sent to the Republic of Macedonia. The opinion of the Arbitration Commission (item 2a) expressed some doubts regarding Macedonia's desire to gain independence, caused by the second part of the referendum question. Therefore, on December 11, in the newspaper "Nova Makedonija", President Gligorov published a reaction due to the preliminary decision of the Arbitration Commission. In the letter sent to Badinter, Gligorov described the consistent, subsequent adoption of legal acts for Macedonia's independence and explained the second part of the referendum question - his conviction that the situation in SFRY would calm down with the mediation of the international community and a new alliance would be created. of the republics.

Kiro Gligorov admitted not being related to the ancient Macedonians. In the Toronto Star on March 15, 1992 he said  "We are Macedonians but we are Slav Macedonians. That's who we are! We have no connection to Alexander the Great and his Macedonia. The ancient Macedonians no longer exist, they had disappeared from history long time ago. Our ancestors came here in the 5th and 6th century (A.D)".

Upon the accession of the Republic of Macedonia to the United Nations, under the reference Former Yugoslav Republic of Macedonia, he delivered his first speech before the General Assembly of the United Nations on 7 April 1993. In the general presidential election, he was re-elected President of the Republic by a majority of votes, on 16 October 1994. On 13 September 1995, the Interim Accord for the normalization of relations with Greece was signed at the United Nations Headquarters. On 2 October, in Belgrade, he signed a recognition agreement with the Federal Republic of Yugoslavia, and the next day, on 3 October 1995, Gligorov was the target of an assassination attempt in Skopje. After several months of treatment, on 10 January 1996, Gligorov returned to his presidency. In Helsinki, a solemn statement by Gligorov confirmed the accession of the Republic of Macedonia to the CSCE Final Document, on 29 May 1996.

Assassination attempt 

On 3 October 1995, Gligorov was the target of a car bomb assassination attempt in Skopje. While on route from his residence to his office, the vehicle carrying Gligorov was blown up by an explosion from a parked vehicle, killing his driver and injuring several passers-by. Gligorov was seriously injured above his right eye and was immediately conveyed to the hospital.

Since the incident there have been no suspects brought to book and no progress has been made in the investigation of the case. However, there have been short-lived speculations as to who could be the culprits. Shortly after bombing, the Minister of Internal Affairs Ljubomir Frčkovski publicly claimed that "a powerful multinational company from a neighbouring country" was behind the assassination attempt, with the Macedonian media pointing at the Bulgarian Multigroup and the Yugoslav KOS as possible suspects. After the attack, many citizens of the country with Bulgarian identity were arrested, claiming that they had also been tortured. During a meeting between Multigroup head Iliya Pavlov and Gligorov in Ohrid, Pavlov assured Gligorov that his organisation was not involved. All investigations were futile.

Gligorov was incapacitated until 17 November 1995. He was permanently blind in one eye as a result. Stojan Andov was acting president during Gligorov's recuperation.

The election for Gligorov's successor took place only a few days before the end of his term.

Personal life 
Gligorov has won numerous international awards and recognitions for his successful, constructive management and regulation of the international relations of the Macedonian state. Following a speech at the University of Pittsburgh, the United States was awarded an honorary doctorate by the University on 21 September 1997. He was awarded the Mediterranean Peace Prize on 5 January 1998 in Naples. After the expiration of the second presidential term, he resigned the presidency from the newly elected candidate Boris Trajkovski. In 2011, he was awarded the Lifetime Achievement Award from the United Macedonian Diaspora.

In October 1943, Gligorov married Nada Misheva, (6 January 1920 – 26 June 2009) daughter of Stojan Mishev. The couple had one son and two daughters.

Kiro Gligorov was the oldest Macedonian political official. On 17 November 1999, when his second presidential term ended, he was 82 years old, and in 2000, the Guinness Book of World Records listed Gligorov as the world's oldest president.

Death
Gligorov died at the age of 94 in the early hours of 1 January 2012, in his sleep. At his own request, the funeral was private with only his closest family in attendance. He was buried in Butel Municipality, Skopje.

Kiro was the father of Vladimir Gligorov, a refounder of the Democratic Party in Serbia.

Honours 
   Order of the Yugoslav Star with Sash 
   Order of Brotherhood and Unity with golden wreath
   Order of Labours with red flag
   Grand Decoration of Honour in Silver with Sash of the Decoration of Honour for Services to the Republic of Austria (1968)
    Jubilee Medal "65 Years of Victory in the Great Patriotic War 1941–1945

References

External links 

 Biography of Kiro Gligorov on the official website of the President of the Republic of Macedonia
 Biography of Kiro Gligorov

1917 births
2012 deaths
People from Štip
University of Belgrade Faculty of Law alumni
Yugoslav communists
Presidents of North Macedonia
Finance ministers of Yugoslavia
Government ministers of Yugoslavia
League of Communists of Macedonia politicians
Social Democratic Union of Macedonia politicians
Central Committee of the League of Communists of Yugoslavia members